Ząbrowo  is a village in the administrative district of Gmina Stare Pole, within the Malbork County of Pomeranian Voivodeship in northern Poland.

Before 1945, the area was a part of Germany. For the history of the region, please see History of Pomerania.

The village has a population of 423.

References

Villages in Malbork County